Bozok may refer to:

 One of the two branches (along with Üçok) in Turkish and Turkic legendary history from which three sons of Oghuz Khan (Günhan, Ayhan, and Yıldızhan) and their 12 clans are traced
 The former name of Yozgat Province in Turkey (1927)
 A former settlement at the current location of Astana, Kazakhstan